Lady in the Dark is a 1944 American musical film directed by Mitchell Leisen, from a screenplay by Frances Goodrich and Albert Hackett that is based on the 1941 musical of the same name by Moss Hart. The film stars Ginger Rogers as a magazine editor, who although successful, finds herself on the edge of a breakdown while juggling her feelings for three prospective suitors, played by Ray Milland, Warner Baxter, and Jon Hall.

Paramount won the screen rights to the musical in February 1941, after a bidding war with Columbia, Warner Bros., and Howard Hughes. The studio initially purchased the property as a vehicle to reunite Rogers with Fred Astaire. However, after negotiations with Astaire failed, the studio cast Milland, who had recently starred with Rogers in Paramount's The Major and the Minor.

The film was first released on February 10, 1944, and was a critical and commercial success. It was nominated for three Academy Awards; for Best Cinematography, Best Music, and Best Art Direction (Hans Dreier, Raoul Pene Du Bois, Ray Moyer).

Plot
Liza Elliott (Ginger Rogers) is the successful editor-in-chief of fashion magazine Allure, being published by Kendall Nesbitt (Warner Baxter). Elliott is a no-nonsense workaholic, who is involved in a relationship with Nesbitt. And while the two wish to marry, they cannot, as Kendall's estranged wife has refused to grant a divorce. Liza has recently developed a series of headaches and strange, bad dreams. On top of all this, she is having to deal at work with marketing manager Charley Johnson (Ray Milland), who annoys her greatly and takes pride in doing so. She reluctantly sees and undergoes psychoanalysis with Dr. Alex Brooks, who suggests that her no-nonsense approach to life is caused by something from her past, which has made her avoid all attempts at ever being as glamorous as the models in her magazine. Liza discounts this theory, and after Kendall announces his wife has finally agreed to a divorce, she dreams of a wedding to him where she is chased to the top of a large wedding cake where Charley questions whether she wishes to marry him.

Movie star Randy Curtis (Jon Hall) comes to the Allure offices for a photo shoot, where he corners her into accepting a dinner date with him. Anxious about the date, Liza intends to break it off, and storms out of Dr. Brooks' office when he suggests she is anxious because she is afraid to compete with other women. Charley also informs Liza he will be leaving Allure for another magazine, which has offered more creative control to him. Kendall confronts Liza about her fears, and she breaks down and confesses she is confused. To try and sort out her feelings, and aware Curtis does not care about her looks, Liza goes on her date with Curtis, changing into a beautiful dress for a change. The date is ruined when they bump into Charley and his date, who aggressively goes after Randy. She goes home, and hallucinates that she is put on trial by Kendall and Charley at a circus (based on a cover earlier designed by Charley). After singing about her troubles, she dreams of her father yelling at her for dressing glamorously. In her story to Dr. Brooks, she tells him of this, and possibly the reason for her devotion to a plain style: following her mother's passing as a young girl, she tried to make him happy by wearing one of her late mother's glamorous dresses, but was instead scolded, and she became detached from him; another incident happened after her high school graduation, where she went to a dance with a boy she liked, who was stolen away by another girl. Dr. Brooks concludes these incidents contributed to her current life, and suggests she allow herself to open herself to her childhood desires.

With this new knowledge, Liza decides to quit her job at the magazine and break off her relationship with Kendall, who agrees bittersweetly. Liza is disappointed to find out Curtis was only courting her to be the head of a new production company he has formed. However, when Charley comes to say good-bye to her, Liza realizes that she loves Charley – the last person she ever expected to. She proposes to promote him to run the magazine alongside her, and after arguing over fonts, the two share a passionate kiss.

Cast

Ginger Rogers as Liza Elliott 
Ray Milland as Charley Johnson
Warner Baxter as Kendall Nesbitt
Jon Hall as Randy Curtis
Barry Sullivan as Dr. Brooks
Mischa Auer as Russell Paxton
Phyllis Brooks as Allison DuBois
Mary Philips as Maggie Grant
Edward Fielding as Dr. Carlton
Don Loper as Adams
Mary Parker as Miss Parker
Catherine Craig as Miss Foster
Marietta Canty as Martha
Virginia Farmer as Miss Edwards
Fay Helm as Miss Bowers
 Charles Smith as Ben
Gail Russell as Barbara
John T. Bambury as Bunny, Midget (uncredited)

Production background

The film was based on the 1941 Broadway musical Lady in the Dark, written by Kurt Weill (music), Ira Gershwin (lyrics), and Moss Hart (book and direction). The film version cut most of the Weill/Gershwin songs from the score. "The Saga of Jenny" and "Girl of the Moment" remained, and part of "This Is New" is played by a nightclub band in the background. Part of "My Ship" was hummed by Ginger Rogers, but the song itself was never sung.

Jon Hall's role had been played on stage by Victor Mature.

Radio adaptation
Lady in the Dark, adapted from the 1944 movie, was broadcast on BBC Home Service, August 14, 1944 (and repeated on September 18, 1944). The radio adaptation was by Rhoderick Walker and produced by Tom Ronald. Although it was adapted from the movie, Gertrude Lawrence played the original part she created in the New York stage production of 1941. Lady in the Dark was twice presented on Lux Radio Theatre. On January 29, 1945 a one-hour adaptation was aired where Ginger Rogers reprised her leading film role of Liza, along with Ray Milland. On February 16, 1953 a second adaptation was aired, starring Judy Garland and John Lund.

References

External links

1944 films
1944 musical films
American musical films
Films based on musicals
Films directed by Mitchell Leisen
Films scored by Robert Emmett Dolan
Paramount Pictures films
1940s English-language films
1940s American films